is a Japanese comedian and actor who performs boke in the comedy trio Neptune. He is nicknamed .

Harada is represented with Watanabe Entertainment. He is a father with two children. Harada has an older sister and a younger brother, in which he is the middle child.

Filmography
To see his appearances with Neptune, see Neptune (owarai).

TV drama

Films

Stage

Variety

Informal programmes

Documentaries
{|class="wikitable"
|-
! Year
! Title
! Network
! Notes
|-
| 2012 || Moshimo Ashita... Kazoku ga Shitsugyō shitara ||rowspan="3"| NHK || Presenter along with announcer Yumiko Udo
|-
|rowspan="5"| 2014 || Mezase! 2020-Nen no Olympian –Tokyo Gorin no Genseki-tachi– Seoyogi no Shinsei × Dō Medalist Aya Terakawa''' || Pilot; MC
|-
|Mezase! 2020-Nen no Olympian –Tokyo Gorin no Genseki-tachi– || MC
|-
|Ichigoichie: Kimi ni kikitai! || NHK-E ||rowspan="2"| Narration
|-
|Crossroad || TV Tokyo
|-
|Nippon Kikō: Boku-ra no Himitsu Kichi –Tokyo Hikarigaoka Kōen– || NHK || Guidance
|}

Advertisements

DubbingStrange World'', Searcher Clade

References

Japanese comedians
Japanese male actors
People from Hiroshima
1970 births
Living people